This is a list of places and organisations named after Edith Cavell.  For major monuments to her memory, see the list at Edith Cavell.

Medical and nursing

Streets

Schools, houses and school buildings

Other

References

Citations

Bibliography

 
 
 
 
 
 
 
 

 
 
 
 
 
 
 

 
 

Lists of things named after people